Chiang Chia (born 29 September 1942 in Datong, Taipei) is former manager of Chinese Taipei national football team. He currently teaches in National Taipei College of Business.

Chiang, majoring physical education, graduated from Taiwan Provincial College of Physical Education in the year of 1965. After finishing serving military service, he became a teacher and a coach in primary education and worked hard to promote football activities. He has served many positions in Chinese Taipei Football Association and taken on the responsibility of national team manager during 1984 Summer Olympics and 1986 FIFA World Cup.

External links
 A brief introduction

1942 births
Living people
Taiwanese football managers
Chinese Taipei national football team managers
Sportspeople from Taipei